The Fussball Club Basel 1893 1975–76 season was their 82nd season since the club was founded. It was their 30th consecutive season in the top flight of Swiss football after they won promotion during the season 1945–46. They played their home games in the St. Jakob Stadium. Félix Musfeld was club chairman for the sixth consecutive period.

Overview

Pre-season
Helmut Benthaus was first team manager for the eleventh consecutive season. There were a number of changes in the team during the pre-season. Goalkeeper Marcel Kunz would have liked to have stayed for another season, but his contract was not prolonged, so he moved on to Nordstern Basel one tier lower for one season before he retired from active football. Kunz had been with the club for 12 seasons. Between the years 1963 and 1975 he had played a total of 373 games for Basel, exactly 200 of these games were in the domestic league. He had won the championship five times, the Swiss Cup twice and the Swiss League Cup once. Karl Odermatt would have stayed with the club, but the board of directors refused to pay the desired wages, so he moved to Young Boys. Odermatt had been with the club for 13 seasons. In that time he played a total of 534 games for Basel, 296 of these in the domestic league scoring 92 league goals. He had also won the championship five times, the Swiss League Cup once, but the Swiss Cup three times. After four seasons with the club Ottmar Hitzfeld moved on to VfB Stuttgart, for him this was a large step forward in his career. Hitzfeld had played 177 games, of these 92 in the league with 66 league goals. Walter Balmer retired from active football, he had been with Basel seven seasons, had played 306 games, 156 in the league scoring 65 goals. Roland Paolucci was also reaching the end of his career, but he decided to add another season with Nordstern Basel. Between the years 1965 and 1975 Paolucci played a total of 133 games for Basel's first team and 65 of these games were in the Nationalliga A (four goals). During this time Paolucci also played for Basel's reserve team.

In the other direction Swiss international Peter Marti signed in from Swiss champions Zürich, Serge Muhmenthaler signed in from Young Boys and Walter Geisser joined from local club Nordstern Basel who played one tier lower. As seen in the previous years Benthaus relied on young players who came up from the reserve team to help, when needed in the first team. 

Basel played a total of 56 games in their 1975–76 season. 26 in the domestic league, seven in the Swiss Cup, two in the Swiss League Cup, four in the Cup of the Alps, five in the Cup of the Alps, two in the 1975–76 European Cup Winners' Cup and 17 were friendly matches. The team scored a total of 129 goals and conceded 96. Basel won six friendly games, drew six and lost five.

Domestic league
The Swiss Football Association was reforming the Swiss football league system this year, reducing the number of teams in the Nationalliga A from 14 to 12 and increasing the Nationalliga B teams from 14 to 16. Therefore, three teams were being relegated and only one promoted. These 14 teams were the top 12 teams from the previous 1974–75 season and the two newly promoted teams Biel-Bienne and La Chaux-de-Fonds. The champions would qualify for the 1975–76 European Cup.  Basel played a good season. But reigning champions Zürich ran away with the title, they won the championship with 44 points, five points clear of second placed Servette and ten points clear of third placed Basel. The second and third placed teams were to have qualified for UEFA Cup, but because Zürich won the double the cup runners-up Servette advanced to the 1976–77 Cup Winners' Cup and the third and forth placed teams advanced tp the 1975–76 UEFA Cup. Lugano and the two newly promoted teams, Biel-Bienne and La Chaux-de-Fonds, suffered relegation.

Swiss Cup and League Cup
Basel started in the Swiss Cup tournament in the round of 32 on 25 September 1975 away against lower tier Grenchen and won this game 2–0 to qualify for the round of 16. Here they were drawn away against Young Boys and here the competition came to an end because they were defeated 1–3.

In the Swiss League Cup Basel started in the round of 32 on 9 August away against St. Gallen and won 4–1. In the round of 16 Basel played away against second tier Young Fellows Zürich and won this easily 8–1. Lower tier Grenchen were drawn as hosts for the quarter-finals and Basel won this easily as well 6–2. Basel were drawn as hosts in the semi-final against Young Boys. There was no revenge for the defeat in the Swiss Cup earlier this season because YB won this clash as well, in overtime 3–5.

European Cup and Coppa delle Alpi
As Swiss Cup winners in the previous season, Basel were qualified for the European Cup Winners' Cup. In the first round of the 1975–76 European Cup Winners' Cup Basel were drawn against Spanisch Cup 1974–75 runners-up Atlético Madrid. Atlético had been beaten in the final by Real Madrid 3–4 after a penalty shoot out, but because Real became Spanish champions they thus entered the 1975–76 European Cup and Atlético competed in this competition as runners-up. The 1st leg was played in St. Jakob Stadium in front of 33,000 spectators and Basel took an early lead through Roland Schönenberger in the third minute. But a double strike from José Eulogio Gárate and Rubén Ayala in the 65th and 68th minute turned the game and Basel were defeated 2–3. In the return leg in Vicente Calderón Stadium, with over 25,000 spectators, Heraldo Bezerra put Atlético in the lead in the 74th minute, Otto Demarmels leveled the score, but this was not enough to stop Atlético advancing to the next round.

In the Coppa delle Alpi (Cup of the Alps) Basel were in a group with Stade de Reims, Olympique Lyonnais and Lausanne-Sport. Two wins and two draws were enough for Basel to qualify for the final. But here they faced Servette in the Charmilles Stadium and lost 0–3.

Players 

 
 

 
 
 
 
 
 
 
 
 

 
  
 
 
 
 
 
 
 
 
 
 

Players who left the squad

Results 
Legend

Friendly matches

Pre-season and mid-season

Winter break to end of season

Nationalliga

League matches

League standings

Swiss Cup

Swiss League Cup

UEFA Cup Winners' Cup

First round

Atlético Madrid won 3–2 on aggregate.

Cup of the Alps 

Group B

NB: teams did not play compatriots

Group table

Final

See also
 History of FC Basel
 List of FC Basel players
 List of FC Basel seasons

References

Sources
 Rotblau: Jahrbuch Saison 2015/2016. Publisher: FC Basel Marketing AG. 
 Die ersten 125 Jahre. Publisher: Josef Zindel im Friedrich Reinhardt Verlag, Basel. 
 Verein "Basler Fussballarchiv" Homepage
 Switzerland 1975–76 at RSSSF
 Swiss League Cup at RSSSF
 Cup of the Alps 1975 at RSSSF

External links
 FC Basel official site

FC Basel seasons
Basel